Felix Annan (born 22 November 1994) is a Ghanaian footballer who last played as a goalkeeper for Maryland Bobcats FC and Ghana.

Club career
Annan began his career at Gomoa Fetteh Feyenoord Academy, before signing for Asante Kotoko. In 2014, Annan was loaned to Real Tamale United, going out on loan again to the West African Football Academy in 2015.

International career
On 9 June 2019, Annan made his debut for Ghana in a 1–0 friendly defeat against Namibia.

References

1994 births
Living people
Association football goalkeepers
Ghanaian footballers
Ghana international footballers
Asante Kotoko S.C. players
Real Tamale United players
West African Football Academy players